Vincent Tulli was born in Paris, 5 February 1966. He is a sound mixer and a sound designer. He is also an actor.

Films

Sound department

1990: Fierrot le pou (Short) (by Mathieu Kassovitz)
1993: Empreintes (Documentary) (by Camille Guichard)
1995: A Mother's Battle (TV Series) (by Eric Woreth)
1995: La Haine (Hate) (by Mathieu Kassovitz)
1995: Confronting the Night (by Eric Woreth)
1996: L'Appartement (The Apartment) (by Gilles Mimouni)
1997: Shabbat night fever (Short) (by Vincent Cassel
1997: Le Milliardaire (Short) (by Julien Eudes)
1997: Assassin(s) (by Mathieu Kassovitz)
1997: A Woman Very Very Very Much in Love (by Ariel Zeitoun)
1997: XXL  (by Ariel Zeitoun)
1998: Taxi (by Gérard Pirès)
1998: Charité biz'ness (de Thierry Barthes et Pierre Jamin)
1999: The Messenger: The Story of Joan of Arc (by Luc Besson)
2000: The Crimson Rivers (Short) (by Mathieu Kassovitz)
2000: D 907 (Short) (by Pascal Guérin)
2001: Kiss of the Dragon (by Chris Nahon)
2002: The Transporter (by Louis Leterrier)
2003: Silver moumoute (Short) (by Christophe Campos)
2003: Comme tu es (Short) (Véronique Séret)
2003: Ong-bak (by Prachya Pinkaew)
2003: Taxi 3 (Film) by Gérard Krawczyk
2003: Cheeky (Film), by David Thewlis
2004: Yes (by Sally Potter)
2005: Danny the Dog (by Louis Leterrier)
2005: It's Our Life! (Gérard Krawczyk)
2006: Paris, je t'aime (by Bruno Podalydès, Gurinder Chadha, Gus Van Sant, Joel Coen & Ethan Coen, Walter Salles, Christopher Doyle, Isabel Coixet, Nobuhiro Suwa, Sylvain Chomet, Alfonso Cuarón, Olivier Assayas, Oliver Schmitz, Richard LaGravenese, Vincenzo Natali, Wes Craven, Tom Tykwer, Gérard Depardieu, Alexander Payne.)
2006: No Body Is Perfect (by Raphaël Sibilla)
2007: Sur ma ligne (documentary) (de Rachid Djaidani)
2007: The Red Inn (Gérard Krawczyk)
2008: 8 (le segment "The story of Panshin Beka") (by Jan Kounen)
2009: Chanel & Stravinsky (by Jan Kounen)

Actor
1997: Une femme très très très amoureuse – Photographer
1997: XXL – Chauffeur
1999: The Messenger: The Story of Joan of Arc – Orleans' Physician
2000: The Crimson Rivers – Computer Technician
2002: The Transporter – Thug (uncredited)
2003: Taxi 3 – Policier Camionnette
2005: Unleashed – Dead Fighter (final film role)

Award
 César Award 1995 : nominated César Award for Best Sound for La Haine (Hate)
 César Award 1999 : Won César Award for Best Sound for Taxi
 César Award 2000 : Won César Award for Best Sound for The Messenger: The Story of Joan of Arc
 César Award 2001 : nominated César Award for Best Sound for The Crimson Rivers
Golden Reel Award 2000 (USA) Best Sound editing for The Messenger: The Story of Joan of Arc

References

External links
  Official website
 

1966 births
Living people
Sound designers